Kajmakčalan (Kaimakchalan), or Kaimaki or Kaimaktsalan  or Voras ( or  or), is a mountain on the border between Greece and North Macedonia. It is the southernmost and highest peak, of a range known in Greek as the Voras Mountains and in Macedonian as Nidže. The frontier between the two countries runs across the summit. It is the third-highest peak in Greece after Mytikas and Smolikas and the fifth-highest in North Macedonia.

Etymology
The word "Kaimaktsalan" is of Ottoman Turkish origin inspired by its white, snowy peak: kaymakçalan means 'kaymak beater'. "Kaymak" in Turkish refers to a dairy product similar to clotted cream.

Geology
The peak consists of granite, gneiss and mica.

Climate
Kajmakčalan has a subarctic climate (Dfc) with short, cool summers and long, cold winters.

History
During World War I, in September 1916, the Battle of Kajmakčalan between Serbian and Bulgarian troops took place at Kajmakčalan and around the adjacent peaks, resulting in a Serbian victory. There is a small church and crypt for the Serbian soldiers who died in the battle. Near the top of the mountain, on the Greek side, there is a small church named Saint Peters (Sveti Petar in Serbian), the peak itself is called, besides Kajmakčalan, Profitis Ilias.

See also
 List of European ultra prominent peaks

References

External links
  Greek Mountain Flora

Greece–North Macedonia border
International mountains of Europe
Landforms of Pella (regional unit)
Mountains of Central Macedonia
Two-thousanders of Greece
Two-thousanders of North Macedonia